Crippa is an Italian surname. Notable people with the surname include:

Dante Crippa (born 1937), Italian footballer
Edward D. Crippa (1899–1960), American politician
Maddalena Crippa (born 1957), Italian actress
Massimo Crippa (born 1965), Italian footballer
Michael Crippa Jr  (born 1994) Car enthusiast 
Nekagenet Crippa (born 1994), Italian athleteYemaneberhan Crippa (born 1996), Italian athlete 

Italian-language surnames